Subroto (19 September 1923 – 20 December 2022) was an Indonesian administrator and economist. He was a doctoral graduate and faculty member of University of Indonesia between 1956 and 1963, Minister of Energy and Natural Resources between 1978 and 1988, and Secretary General of OPEC between 1988 and 1994. Like many Indonesians, Subroto is known by just a single name. Subroto died on 20 December 2022, at the age of 99.

See also
Politics of Indonesia

References

Further reading
Profile at TokohIndonesia.com (in Indonesian)
Benito Lopulalan, 'Subroto: Man of His Country', The Jakarta Globe, 21 September 2011.

1923 births
2022 deaths
Energy ministers
Government ministers of Indonesia
Indonesian economists
Secretaries General of OPEC
University of Indonesia alumni
Academic staff of the University of Indonesia
People from Surakarta